Thomas Babington Boulton OBE (6 November 1925 – 1 July 2016) was president of the Association of Anaesthetists of Great Britain and Ireland.
He was appointed OBE in the 1991 New Year Honours.

References 

1925 births
2016 deaths
People from Bishop Auckland
English anaesthetists
Officers of the Order of the British Empire
University of Michigan fellows
Presidents of the Association of Anaesthetists